The 1996–97 Australian region cyclone season was an above average tropical cyclone season. It ran from 1 November 1996 to 30 April 1997. The regional tropical cyclone operational plan also defines a tropical cyclone year separately from a tropical cyclone season, and the "tropical cyclone year" ran from 1 July 1996 to 30 June 1997.

Tropical cyclones in this area were monitored by four Tropical Cyclone Warning Centres (TCWCs): the Australian Bureau of Meteorology in Perth, Darwin, and Brisbane; and TCWC Port Moresby in Papua New Guinea.


Season summary

Systems

Tropical Cyclone Lindsay 

During that day the system moved to the southwest around a weak mid-upper level anticyclone, before it came under the starting to move southwards during 10 July. At 1500 UTC, the JTWC reported that Lindsay was becoming better organized and issued a Tropical Cyclone Formation Alert on the system. After the JTWC had initiated warnings on the system, it began to rapidly weaken as it came under the influence of strong upper level north-westerlies. During the next day, both the JTWC and TCWC Perth issued their final advisories on Lindsay as it weakened below cyclone intensity and became extratropical. Lindsay's remnants were tracked as they moved towards the southeast until they were absorbed into a broad trough of low pressure on 13 July.

Tropical Cyclone Melanie–Bellamine 

Melanie formed from a low near Cocos Island on 30 October 1996. It deepened to a category 2 storm overnight on 1 November and it moved westwards, with a subsequent name change to Bellamine. It dissipated on 11 November.

Tropical Cyclone Nicholas 

A tropical depression formed on 12 December 1996 near Timor. The depression moved south before being classified as a cyclone on 14 December and was named Nicholas. The storm made landfall west of Derby, Australia as a tropical storm on the 15th and dissipated the next day.

Tropical Cyclone Ophelia 

Ophelia formed between two tropical cyclones, Nicholas (near the north Kimberley coast) and Elvina near 80°E, to the east of Christmas Island on 13 December 1996. Its track was somewhat unusual in that it moved towards the southeast for most of its lifetime. The weak cyclone had no impact on Christmas Island or northwest Australia and dissipated on 19 December.

Tropical Cyclone Fergus 

Fergus was a Category 2 storm that formed in the Pacific Ocean, lasting from 29 December to 31 December 1996 until becoming extratropical near New Zealand. The storm dropped heavy rainfall across an already saturated area, with totals of over  near Thames. The rainfall led to widespread flooding and forced many to evacuate. Severe road damage occurred, with some roads remaining closed for over a week. Gusty winds from Fergus downed trees and power lines, and caused property damage.

Tropical Cyclone Phil 

A weak cyclone, Phil crossed the northern part of Australia between 26 December and 27 December 1996. The storm then moved westward where it encountered vertical wind shear and dissipated on 31 December. It reformed in the South-West Indian Ocean basin on 8 January 1997 and remained as a tropical disturbance until it finally dissipated on 16 January.

Severe Tropical Cyclone Rachel 

On 31 December, a tropical low formed from a monsoon trough inland, near Darwin. At that time, the convection was persistent on the mid-level circulation of the low as it moved slowly to the southwest. On 3 January, with favourable environmental conditions—including warm ocean waters and low wind shear, the low strengthened to Tropical Cyclone Rachel, while located to the south-southwest of Melville Island. The cyclone then slowly accelerated to the southwest, before passing over Northern Kimberley, which weakened the storm. On 5 January, it moved offshore near Cape Leveque as it moved parallel to the coastline. It rapidly strengthened to a Category 3 severe tropical cyclone as it accelerated to the south-southeast, before making a direct hit on Port Hedland on the afternoon of 7 January.  It rapidly weakened inland and it was last noted on 10 January as it entered South Australia.

Despite the cyclone passing directly over Port Hedland, the damages are mostly minor. The power was lost in parts of the town, and some trees are uprooted. There were also reports of flooding.

Severe Tropical Cyclone Drena 

Cyclone Drena crossed from the South Pacific on 4 January with winds of 140 miles per hour. The storm again crossed out 2 days later.

Tropical Cyclone 18S

Severe Tropical Cyclone Pancho-Helinda 

Pancho formed to the north of Cocos Islands during 20 January 1997. It moved south towards Cocos Islands, then moved southwest, intensifying rapidly to a Category 4 or Category 5 cyclone with an estimated central pressure of 925 hPa by the morning of 22 January. Pancho then was renamed Helinda by the Mauritian TCWC and weakened. By 29 January Pancho/Helinda was moving from the northwest towards Cocos Islands again, however again it changed direction to the southwest and reintensified to Category 4. It finally weakened to a tropical depression by 5 February.

Tropical Cyclone Gillian 

Tropical Cyclone Gillian existed from 10 February to 12 February.

Tropical Cyclone Harold 

Tropical Cyclone Harold existed from 16 February to 21 February.

Tropical Cyclone Ita 

Tropical Cyclone Ita developed rapidly off the north coast of Queensland on 23 February 1997. The system moved southernly then southwest. The development inhibited from the northerly upper flow between an upper low over Queensland and an anticyclone in the Coral Sea and the lowest central pressure is reached with 994 hPa on 24 February. On the same day it makes landfall on the coast southeast of Townsville where it dissipated quickly.

Minimal wind damage, moderate flooding in rivers and creeks, and a tornado that occurred in Yukan were reported on 24 February.

Tropical Cyclone Justin 

Justin had a long 3 week life in March 1997. Peaking as a Category 3 cyclone, and making landfall as a Category 2, it caused significant damage in the Cairns region which it approached on two occasions. It was the largest cyclone to hit Northern Queensland in 1997. Houses were undermined by huge waves, a marina and boats were severely damaged, roads and bridges suffered from flood and landslide damage and huge losses were inflicted on sugar cane, fruit and vegetable crops. The death toll in Queensland was seven including five on a yacht which sank. There were 26 who died in Papua New Guinea which was also severely affected. Total estimated costs in Australia were $190 million (1997 values).

Severe Tropical Cyclone Rhonda 

Cyclone Rhonda formed from an area of persistent convection near 10°S 80°E. It reached cyclone strength on 11 May 1997. Rhonda intensified into a Category 4 status. The cyclone continued moving south. The upper shear increased, resulting in rapid weakening before dissipating and being absorbed to a cut-off low pressure system near the Western Australia coast on 17 May. No damages were reported from the cyclone.

Other systems 
On October 15, TCWC Perth reported that a tropical low developed within a near equatorial trough of low pressure, to the southwest of the Indonesian island of Sumatra. Over the next few days, the low moved into the South-West Indian Ocean basin while developing further, before being named Antoinette by RSMC La Réunion during October 18.

Seasonal effects 

|-
| Lindsay ||  || bgcolor=#| || bgcolor=#| || bgcolor=#| || None ||  ||  ||
|-
| Antoinette ||  || bgcolor=#| || bgcolor=#| || bgcolor=#| || None ||  ||  ||
|-
| Melanie –Bellamine ||  || bgcolor=#| || bgcolor=#| || bgcolor=#| || None ||  ||  ||
|-
| Nicholas ||  || bgcolor=#| || bgcolor=#| || bgcolor=#| || Western Australia ||  ||  ||
|-
| Ophelia ||  || bgcolor=#| || bgcolor=#| || bgcolor=#| || None ||  ||  ||
|-
| Fergus ||  || bgcolor=#| || bgcolor=#| || bgcolor=#| || Solomon Islands, VanuatuNew Caledonia, New Zealand ||  ||  ||
|-
| Phil ||  || bgcolor=#| || bgcolor=#| || bgcolor=#| || Northern Australia, Western Australia ||  ||  ||
|-
| Rachel || 2–10 January || bgcolor=#|Category 3 severe tropical cyclone || bgcolor=#| || bgcolor=#| || Northern Territory, Western Australia ||  ||  || 
|-
| Drena ||  || bgcolor=#|Category 4 severe tropical cyclone || bgcolor=#| || bgcolor=#| || Solomon Islands, VanuatuNew Caledonia, New Zealand ||  ||  || 
|-
| 18S ||  || bgcolor=#| || bgcolor=#| || bgcolor=#| || None ||  ||  ||
|-
| Pancho ||  || bgcolor=#| || bgcolor=#| || bgcolor=#| || None ||  || 
|-
| Gillian ||  || bgcolor=#| || bgcolor=#| || bgcolor=#| || Papua New Guinea, Queensland ||  ||  ||
|-
| Harold ||  || bgcolor=#| || bgcolor=#| || bgcolor=#| || New Caledonia ||  ||  ||
|-
| Unnamed ||  || bgcolor=#| || bgcolor=#| || bgcolor=#| || Western Australia ||  ||  ||
|-
| Unnamed ||  || bgcolor=#| || bgcolor=#| || bgcolor=#| || Western Australia ||  ||  ||
|-
| Ita ||  || bgcolor=#| || bgcolor=#| || bgcolor=#| || Queensland ||  ||  ||
|-
| Unnamed ||  || bgcolor=#| || bgcolor=#| || bgcolor=#| || Northern Territory, Western Australia ||  ||  ||
|-
| Justin ||  || bgcolor=#| || bgcolor=#| || bgcolor=#| || Solomon Islands, Papua New Guinea Queensland ||  ||  ||
|-
| Rhonda ||  || bgcolor=#| || bgcolor=#| || bgcolor=#| || Cocos Island, Western Australia ||  ||  ||
|-

See also 

 List of Southern Hemisphere tropical cyclone seasons
 Atlantic hurricane seasons: 1996, 1997
 Pacific hurricane seasons: 1996, 1997
 Pacific typhoon seasons: 1996, 1997
 North Indian Ocean cyclone seasons: 1996, 1997

References

External links 
 World Meteorological Organization
 Australian Bureau of Meteorology (TCWC's Perth, Darwin & Brisbane).
 TCWC Jakarta
 Joint Typhoon Warning Center .

 
Australian region cyclone seasons
Articles which contain graphical timelines